Mele Perîşan (born Mohammad Abulqasim, 1356–1431) was a Kurdish poet who wrote in Kurdish. His main work Parishan-nama is considered to be the oldest work in Gorani. He also wrote in Laki, and many of his works are kept in different libraries in Iran. Mele Perîşan was affiliated with the Ardalan vassaldom.

Biography
Very little is known about the life of Mele Perîşan, but it is plausible that he was born in Dinavar and of the Ghiasvand tribe. He was Shia, Hurufist, spoke Arabic, Persian and Turkish beside Kurdish, and spent most of his life in the Dinavar area.

He was passionate about his religion in his poetry and was moreover an admirer of Rabia of Basra and her position on halal. While Parishan-nama is his main work, he also wrote popular drinking songs in Kurdish which have become popular among Kurds and Iranians.

Parishan-nama 
The diwan Parishan-nama was written in Gorani with many Laki words, and contained Hurufist propaganda. It is the only known Hurifist text in Kurdish. It was first printed in Kermanshah in 1916 and subsequently printed several times in different places. It had a syllabic meter, which was a common characteristic of Gorani poetry.

Literature

References

Notes

Citations

Further reading 
 

1356 births
1431 deaths
Kurdish poets
People from Kermanshah Province
Kurdish Sufis
Sufi literature
14th-century Kurdish people
15th-century Kurdish people